Counterpoint is a compilation album by In the Nursery, released in 1989 through Sweatbox Records. It collects tracks from several of their early EPs.

Track listing

Personnel 
In the Nursery
Klive Humberstone – instruments
Nigel Humberstone – instruments
Production and additional personnel
Ant Bennett – instruments on "Butyrki"v
Chris Bigg – design
In the Nursery – production

References

External links 
 

1989 compilation albums
In the Nursery albums